The 2015 FIFA Beach Soccer World Cup was the eighth edition of the FIFA Beach Soccer World Cup, the premier international beach soccer competition for men's national teams, which has been organized by FIFA since 2005. Overall, this was the 18th edition of a world cup in beach soccer since the establishment of the Beach Soccer World Championships which ran from 1995 to 2004 but was not governed by FIFA. It was also the third edition to take place under the biennial system introduced in 2009.

The tournament took place from 9 to 19 July 2015 at Praia da Baía in Espinho, Portugal, after the country's bid was selected by the FIFA Executive Committee on 28 May 2013, from among twelve proposals. This was the second time that Portugal hosted a FIFA competition, after the 1991 FIFA World Youth Championship. Fifteen teams advanced through their respective continental qualification competitions to join the host team in the final tournament. The final draw occurred on 28 April 2015 at the Espinho Multimedia Auditorium, setting up a total of 32 matches that were played at the Espinho Stadium – a purpose-built temporary venue with a capacity of 3,500 – and attended by a total of 96,300 people.

After missing the previous edition, Portugal reached the final – eliminating two-time defending champions Russia in the semi-finals – and defeated first-time finalists Tahiti 5–3 to claim their second world title and their first in the FIFA era. Alan and Madjer were the only two surviving players from the Portuguese squad that won their previous world title in 2001 to also win these championships.

Host selection
Twelve FIFA member associations from five confederations officially announced their interest in hosting the 2015 Beach Soccer World Cup by the deadline of 14 September 2012. On 28 May 2013, the FIFA Executive Committee, gathered in Mauritius, announced that the tournament would be held in Portugal. It was the second time that Portugal staged a FIFA competition, after the 1991 FIFA World Youth Championship.
Candidate associations:

 Brazil
 Bulgaria
 Ecuador
 El Salvador
 France
 Hungary
 Mauritius
 Portugal (host)
 Russia
 Senegal
 Switzerland
 Thailand

Qualification
Qualifying rounds took place in 2014 and 2015. Portugal qualified automatically as hosts.

African Zone

The CAF Beach Soccer Championship took place in Roche Caiman, Seychelles on 14–19 April 2015. A total of eight teams took part in the tournament, where seven spots (other than host nation Seychelles) were determined through qualifiers held in February and March 2015. The top two teams qualified for the 2015 FIFA Beach Soccer World Cup. Senegal and Madagascar won their respective semi-finals on 18 April 2015 to qualify for the World Cup, with Madagascar defeating Senegal in the final on the next day to win the tournament.

Asian Zone

The AFC Beach Soccer Championship took place in Doha, Qatar on 23–28 March 2015. A total of 14 teams took part in the tournament (Palestine entered but withdrew). The top three teams qualified for the 2015 FIFA Beach Soccer World Cup. Oman and Japan won their respective semi-finals on 27 March 2015 to qualify for the World Cup. On the next day, Iran won the third place match to also book a place in the World Cup, while Oman defeated Japan in the final to win the tournament.

European Zone

The UEFA qualifiers took place in Jesolo, Italy on 5–14 September 2014. A total of 23 teams took part in the tournament (Georgia entered but withdrew). The top four teams qualified for the 2015 FIFA Beach Soccer World Cup. Switzerland became the first team (other than host nation Portugal) to qualify for the 2015 FIFA Beach Soccer World Cup on 11 September 2014. On the next day, Russia, Spain and Italy also booked a place in the World Cup by advancing to the semi-finals, with Russia defeating Switzerland in the final two days later to win the tournament, and Italy defeating Spain to finish third.

North, Central American and Caribbean Zone

The CONCACAF Beach Soccer Championship took place in Costa del Sol, El Salvador on 28 March–4 April 2015. A total of 16 teams took part in the tournament. The top two teams qualified for the 2015 FIFA Beach Soccer World Cup. Mexico and Costa Rica won their respective semi-finals on 3 April 2015 to qualify for the World Cup, with Mexico defeating Costa Rica in the final on the next day to win the tournament.

Oceanian Zone
The OFC Beach Soccer Championship was scheduled to take place in Tahiti on 16–22 February 2015. However, the tournament was cancelled, and Tahiti were designated by the OFC as their representative.

South American Zone

The CONMEBOL Beach Soccer Championship took place in Manta, Ecuador on 19–26 April 2015. A total of 10 teams took part in the tournament. The top three teams qualified for the 2015 FIFA Beach Soccer World Cup. Brazil and Paraguay won their respective semi-finals on 25 April 2015 to qualify for the World Cup. On the next day, Argentina won the third place match to also book a place in the World Cup, while Brazil defeated Paraguay in the final to win the tournament.

Teams
The following 16 teams qualified for the final tournament:

Notes:
1. Teams that made their debut.

Venue
All matches were played at the Espinho Stadium, a purpose-built 3,500-capacity venue located in Praia da Baía, Espinho.

Referees
FIFA chose 24 officials from 24 different countries to referee matches at the World Cup, with at least one referee representing each confederation: four from AFC, three from CAF, five from CONMEBOL, three from CONCACAF, one from OFC and eight from UEFA.

Draw
The final draw was held on 28 April 2015 at the Espinho Multimedia Auditorium. The 16 teams were drawn into four groups of four teams, with hosts Portugal being seeded in Group A and defending champions Russia being seeded in Group D. Switzerland and Brazil, the second and third-ranked teams in the FIFA World Ranking, were the other two seeded teams. Teams from the same confederation could not be drawn against each other for the group stage, except one of the groups that must contain two UEFA teams as there were five UEFA teams.

Squads

Each team must name a squad of 12 players (two of whom must be goalkeepers) by the FIFA deadline. The squads were officially announced by FIFA on 2 July 2015.

Group stage
In the group stage, teams earn three points for a win in regulation time, two points for a win in extra time, one point for a win in a penalty shoot-out, and no points for a defeat.

Following FIFA's rule changes issued in July 2014, this was the first World Cup to award just one point for a penalty shoot-out win (as opposed to two points in all previous World Cups) as well as penalty shoots outs being best of three rather than sudden death from the start.

All times are in WEST (UTC+1).

Tiebreaking
The ranking of each team in each group will be determined by the following criteria:
 greatest number of points obtained in all group matches;

If two or more teams are equal on the basis of the above criterion, their rankings will be determined as follows:

Group A

Group B

Group C

Group D

Knockout stage

Bracket

Quarter-finals

Semi-finals

Third place match

Final

Awards
In the aftermath of the final, FIFA presented individual awards to the three best players of the tournament, top goal-scorers, and to the best goalkeeper. In addition, a collective award was given to the team with the most points in the Fair Play ranking. Since three players all scored 8 goals, other stats such as assists, penalties and matches played were then considered to work out the standings between them. Notably, this World Cup saw the fewest goals ever scored for a player to claim the golden boot.

Statistics

Goalscorers
8 goals

  Pedro Moran
  Madjer
  Noel Ott

7 goals

  Gabriele Gori
  Emmanuele Zurlo
  Kirill Romanov
  Raimana Li Fung Kuee

6 goals
  Dmitrii Shishin

5 goals

  Alan
  Belchior
  Naea Bennett
  Tearii Labaste

4 goals

  Mohammad Ahmadzadeh
  Paolo Palmacci
  Takasuke Goto
  Ibrahima Baldé
  Antonio
  Heimanu Taiarui
  Patrick Tepa

3 goals

  Bokinha
  Bruno Xavier
  Mauricinho
  Rodrigo
  Amir Akbari
  Mohammad Ali Mokhtari
  Simone Marinai
  Naoya Matsuo
  Bernardin Rasolomandimby
  Yahya Al-Araimi
  Juan López
  Bê Martins
  Rui Coimbra
  Artur Paporotnyi
  Anatoliy Peremitin
  Dejan Stankovic
  Heiarii Tavanae

2 goals

  Federico Hilaire
  Luciano Sirico
  Danny Johnson
  Greivin Pacheco
  Farid Boloukbashi
  Moslem Mesigar
  Dario Ramacciotti
  Ramon Maldonado
  Hani Al-Dhabit
  Ishaq Al-Qassmi
  Khalid Al-Araimi
  Bruno Novo
  Yury Krasheninnikov
  Ilya Leonov
  Aleksey Makarov
  Egor Shaykov
  Anton Shkarin
  Babacar Fall
  Llorenç
  Nico
  Stephan Leu

1 goal

  Federico Costas
  Luciano Franceschini
  Santiago Hilaire
  Rodrigo López
  Facundo Minici
  Datinha
  Fernando Ddi
  Mão
  José Mendoza
  Vladimir Adanis
  Faroogh Dara
  Mehran Morshedi
  Francesco Corosiniti
  Michele di Palma
  Alessio Frainetti
  Takuya Akaguma
  Shotaro Haraguchi
  Ozu Moreira
  Takaaki Oba
  Teruki Tabata
  Tianasoa Rabeasimbola
  Tokindrainy Randriamampandry
  Flavien Razafimahatratra
  Ymelda Razafimandimby
  Gerardo Gómez
  Abdiel Villa
  Ghaith Al-Alawi
  Abdullah Al-Sauti
  Édgar Barreto
  Wilson Rodriguez
  Jesús Rolon
  Elinton Andrade
  Léo Martins
  Jordan Santos
  Bruno Torres
  Zé Maria
  Andrey Bukhlitskiy
  Gorgui Faye
  Pape Amadou Kamara
  Papa Ndour
  Papa Modou N'Doye
  Ngalla Sylla
  Ibra Thioune
  Raúl Mérida
  Philipp Borer
  Michael Misev
  Angelo Schirinzi
  Tainui Lehartel
  Angelo Tchen
  Jonathan Torohia
  Teva Zaveroni

Own goals

  Andres Villegas (against Italy)
  Adrian Gonzalez (against Brazil)
  Stephan Leu (against Portugal)

Final standings

References

External links
FIFA Beach Soccer World Cup Portugal 2015, FIFA.com
FIFA Beach Soccer World Cup Portugal 2015 , Beach Soccer Worldwide
FIFA Technical Report

 
FIFA Beach Soccer World Cup

Fifa Beach Soccer World Cup
FIFA Beach Soccer
International association football competitions hosted by Portugal